Sādhanā – Academy Proceedings in Engineering Sciences, is a monthly peer-reviewed scientific journal published by Springer Science+Business Media on behalf of the Indian Academy of Sciences. It was established in 1978 and covers all branches of engineering and applied science.

Abstracting and indexing
The journal is abstracted and indexed in several databases including:
 Science Citation Index
 Scopus
 SPIRES
 Inspec
 Zentralblatt MATH
 Chemical Abstracts Service
According to the Journal Citation Reports, the journal had a 2015 impact factor of 0.769.

See also 
 Pramana

References

External links 
 

Engineering journals
English-language journals
Monthly journals
Publications established in 1978
Springer Science+Business Media academic journals